Oudin is a surname. Notable people with the surname include:

 César Oudin (c.1560–1625), French linguist and philologist
 Casimir Oudin (1638-1717), French monk and bibliographer 
 Eugène Oudin (1858–1894), American baritone, composer and translator
 Manny Oudin (born 1968), American soccer coach and player
 Melanie Oudin (born 1991), American tennis player
 Paul Oudin (1851–1923), French doctor